Breckerfeld is a town in the district of Ennepe-Ruhr-Kreis, in North Rhine-Westphalia, (Germany). It is located in the southeasternmost part of the Ruhr area in northern Sauerland. The town is a member of Regionalverband Ruhr (association).

Geography
Breckerfeld is a rural community in a hilly area. The weather around the city is generally cool with a substantial amount of rain. The town consists of two administrative parts: Breckerfeld proper and Waldbauer.

History
Breckerfeld has had town rights since 1396 and was a member of the Hanseatic League. From 1907 until 1963 the Haspe–Voerde–Breckerfeld Light Railway connected Breckerfeld with the Elberfeld–Dortmund railway at Haspe. In 1970, the independent municipality of Dahl joined the town of Breckerfeld. In 1975, the federal parliament decided to reorganize this area into falling within the boundaries of the nearby district-free city, Hagen.

Nena, one of Germany's most successful pop-singers, spent the first several years of her life in Breckerfeld.

Politics
The current mayor of Breckerfeld is André Dalhaus of the CDU. In the most recent mayoral election on 13 September 2020, he was elected unopposed with 88% of votes in favour and 12% against.

Local council

The Breckerfeld municipal council governs the city alongside the Mayor. The most recent council election was held on 13 September 2020, and the results were as follows:

! colspan=2| Party
! Votes
! %
! +/-
! Seats
! +/-
|-
| bgcolor=| 
| align=left| Christian Democratic Union (CDU)
| 2,106
| 48.5
|  1.4
| 15
|  1
|-
| bgcolor=| 
| align=left| Social Democratic Party (SPD)
| 764
| 17.6
|  6.5
| 5
|  2
|-
| bgcolor=| 
| align=left| Alliance 90/The Greens (Grüne)
| 744
| 17.1
|  4.7
| 5
|  1
|-
| 
| align=left| Voters' Association Breckerfeld
| 422
| 9.7
|  1.3
| 3
| ±0
|-
| bgcolor=| 
| align=left| Free Democratic Party (FDP)
| 308
| 7.1
|  1.6
| 2
| ±0
|-
! colspan=2| Valid votes
! 4,344
! 98.6
! 
! 
! 
|-
! colspan=2| Invalid votes
! 60
! 1.4
! 
! 
! 
|-
! colspan=2| Total
! 4,404
! 100.0
! 
! 30
! ±0
|-
! colspan=2| Electorate/voter turnout
! 7,400
! 59.5
! 
! 
! 
|-
| colspan=7| Source: Hansestadt Breckerfeld
|}

Twin cities
  Gençay, Vienne, France

References

Towns in North Rhine-Westphalia
Ennepe-Ruhr-Kreis
Members of the Hanseatic League